Yanawayin (Quechua yana black, Ancash Quechua wayi house, "black house", -n a suffix, other spellings Yanahuain, Yanahuin, Yanahuni, Yanahuani) is a lake in the central Peruvian Andes. It lies in the Lima Region, Huaral Province, Andamarca District, near the village of Yanawayin (Yanahuain).

Landslide 
It created a wave of  that destroyed the Chungar Mine camp on the shore, owned by the Mining Company (Cia Minera Chungar, S.A.), destroyed all the mines' surface facilities, and killed 200–600 miners.

See also 
 Willkaqucha

References 

Lakes of Peru
Lakes of Lima Region
Landslides in Peru
Landslides in 1971
1971 tsunamis